Tam Dương is a rural district (huyện) of Vĩnh Phúc province in the Red River Delta region of northern Vietnam. As of 2003 the district had a population of 94,124. The district covers an area of 107 km². The district capital lies at Hợp Hòa.

References

Districts of Vĩnh Phúc province